Authorized (foaled 14 February 2004) is an Irish-bred and British-trained Thoroughbred racehorse, winner of the 2007 Epsom Derby.

Background
Authorized was foaled on 14 February 2004 and was sired by Montjeu, winner of the Irish Derby, Prix du Jockey Club and Prix de l'Arc de Triomphe in 1999 and the King George VI and Queen Elizabeth Stakes in 2000. Authorized's dam, the unraced Funsie, was sired by Saumarez, winner of the Prix de l'Arc de Triomphe in 1990. Funsie is owned by the Irish jockey Mick Kinane, who is one-third of the partnership which bred Authorized. Kinane would go on to ride against Authorized in the 2007 Epsom Derby, finishing last on Archipenko.

He was sold as a foal for 95,000 guineas to Tony Nerses at Tattersalls Newmarket, England sales in November 2004 and returned there in October 2005 as a yearling to be bought by the Newmarket trainer Peter Chapple-Hyam for 400,000 guineas on behalf of the Kuwaiti businessmen and racing partners Saleh al Homaizi and Imad al Sagar.

He was broken at Fawley House Stud by Danni & Steve O'Neill in 2006/7.

Authorized was trained throughout his career by Peter Chapple-Hyam at his St Gatien stables in Newmarket.

Racing career

2006
Authorized made his racecourse debut at Newbury Racecourse on 15 September 2006, in the one mile Haynes, Hanson and Clark Conditions Stakes. Ridden by Eddie Ahern, he finished third of seven runners behind the winner, Teslin. He was beaten by a head into third by Aqaleem and the Racing Post's assessment of Authorized was that "he is bred to make a better three-year-old and looks sure to improve and win races."

A month later, on 21 October 2006, Authorized returned to Newbury to contest the Group One Racing Post Trophy over one mile. The race was run on heavy going, and Authorized was ridden for the first time by Frankie Dettori. He won at odds of 25 to 1, by one and three quarter lengths from Charlie Farnsbarns. The odds-on favourite Eagle Mountain finished fourth. Authorized was quoted immediately after the race at 16 to 1 for the 2007 Epsom Derby but this was soon cut to 10 to 1.

2007
Authorized's first run as a three-year-old came in the ten-furlong Dante Stakes at York Racecourse on 17 May. Ridden by Frankie Dettori, Authorized was sent off 10 to 11 favourite and won by four lengths from Raincoat. It appeared at the time to be the best performance in any of the 2007 Trial races for the Epsom Derby and Authorized was made favourite for the race.

Media attention ahead of the Derby focused on Frankie Dettori who, despite winning all the other British Classics at least twice each, had so far failed to win the Derby in 14 attempts. For the race itself, run at Epsom Downs Racecourse on 2 June 2007, Authorized was a clear favourite at odds of 5 to 4, and justified the odds by winning by five lengths in a fast time. Dropped back in the field early on, he came to join the leaders inside the final two furlongs and won comfortably. His winning margin has not been bettered since Slip Anchor won in 1985 and in a faster time than either Motivator in 2005 or Sir Percy in 2006. Eagle Mountain finished second and Aqaleem third.

Breeding rights to Authorized were sold to Sheikh Mohammed al Maktoum in June 2007. He was leased back to his owners for the remainder of the 2007 racing season and remained at Peter Chapple-Hyam's stables.

Authorized's third run of 2007 came in the Eclipse Stakes at Sandown Park on 7 July, where attempted to become the first Epsom Derby winner to win the Eclipse since Nashwan in 1989, and the first Epsom Derby winner to win another race of any description since High Chaparral in 2002. He was provided with a pacemaker, Champery, to give him a strong pace in an effort to test the stamina of his closest expected rival, George Washington, but despite beating George Washington he finished second to Notnowcato, who was switched to the stands side of the course by Ryan Moore to exploit the faster ground there.

Authorized returned to the racecourse on 21 August in the Juddmonte International Stakes over an extended ten furlongs at York Racecourse. Sent off the 6 to 4 favourite, he was opposed by six runners including his Eclipse Stakes conqueror, Notnowcato and the King George VI and Queen Elizabeth Stakes winner, Dylan Thomas. Always travelling well, Authorized took the lead just over a furlong out and beat Dylan Thomas by a length.

He ran his last race in Paris at the Prix des Arc de Triomphe. Dylan Thomas won this event at odds of 11/2. Authorized heavily backed and sent off at evens was never in contention to win the race, taking the wide outside route. Frankie Dettori's words as he dismounted were "this was not the same horse I'm used to riding".

Retirement

Authorized retired as a racehorse on Wednesday 10 October just a few days after his disappointing race in Paris. Trainer of Authorized Chapple-Hyam hailed the son of Montjeu as "The King". Chapple-Hyam: "Authorized is the King. He is the best horse I've ever trained and I'll never forget him." He continued: "He goes with the best wishes of everyone connected to the yard and I'm sure he'll be a big success as a stallion. I look forward to one day hopefully training his progeny", he told peterchapplehyam.com.

Authorized won four of his seven starts and amassed over £1.25million in total prize money.

Stud career

Authorized stood as a stallion for the Darley organisation at the Dalham Hall Stud near Newmarket, England before moving to the Haras de Logis in Normandy in 2014. His first two-year-olds reached the racecourse in 2011. In 2019 the stallion was bought by the Turkish Jockey Club and was exported to stand in Turkey.

Authorized has sired 6 individual Group 1 winners:
 Ambivalent – Pretty Polly Stakes (2013)
 Complacent – Spring Champion Stakes (2013)
 Hartnell – The BMW (2015), Turnbull Stakes (2016), C F Orr Stakes (2018), Epsom Handicap (2018)
 Pounamu – Kingston Town Classic (2017)
 Santiago – Irish Derby (2020)
 Seal of Approval – British Champions Fillies and Mares Stakes (2013)

His National Hunt winners include Nichols Canyon and Tiger Roll.

Pedigree

References

 Bloodhorse.com article

External links
Authorized's pedigree and partial racing stats
Authorized's profile on the British Horseracing Board website
 Career 1-2-3 Colour Chart – Authorized

 

2004 racehorse births
Racehorses trained in the United Kingdom
Racehorses bred in Ireland
Cartier Award winners
Thoroughbred family 16-c
Epsom Derby winners